Ben Johnston (born 8 November 1978 in Clatterbridge, Bebington, Merseyside) is an English rugby union footballer who currently coaches and occasionally plays at centre for Old Georgians R.F.C. in Surrey Counties League.

Johnston started his professional career at Saracens in 1998. His form in his first couple of seasons led to selection for the Tour of South Africa in 2000.

Whilst he did not feature in a Test, he did play in a tour match against the Gauteng Falcons.

Johnston was selected for the 2002 tour of Argentina, making his debut against Los Pumas.

His second and final cap came in a victory over New Zealand at Twickenham.

Johnston also represented England Saxons at the 2003 Churchill Cup and 2006 Churchill Cup.

After seeing out a two-year deal with French team Club Athlétique Brive, Johnston signed as player-coach with Nottingham R.F.C. for the 2009-10 season.

Following his stint at Nottigham, Johnston now holds the role of head coach for London SW3 team Old Georgians RFC having also played for the club in the 2019/2020 season.

References

External links
 England profile
 Nottingham profile
 Saracens Profile

1978 births
Living people
CA Brive players
England international rugby union players
English expatriate rugby union players
English expatriate sportspeople in France
English rugby union players
Expatriate rugby union players in France
Nottingham R.F.C. players
Rugby union centres
Rugby union players from Bebington
Saracens F.C. players